On January 23, 2023, a spree shooting occurred at two nearby farms in Half Moon Bay, California. Seven people were killed, and an eighth person was critically injured. It was described as "workplace violence". The suspect, Chunli Zhao, was taken into custody after he parked outside the sheriff's substation downtown. He lived and worked at the first shooting scene, California Terra Gardenformerly Mountain Mushroom Farmand had previously worked at the second shooting scene, Concord Farms.

Background 
Seven months earlier, a manager at California Terra Garden who was not Zhao allegedly opened fire with a handgun at a coworker's trailer following a dispute and was later charged with attempted murder and criminal threats, as well as shooting into an occupied dwelling. According to the vice mayor of Half Moon Bay, it is difficult for those who are undocumented or not in the country legally, including some of the workers at California Terra Garden and in the city's farming community at large, to seek help from local authorities.

Shootings
At 2:22 p.m. PST (UTC-8), first responders were notified of a shooting at Mountain Mushroom Farm located in Half Moon Bay. Upon arriving at the farm, they discovered four deceased individuals with gunshot wounds. A fifth victim who survived was airlifted by helicopter to Stanford University Medical Center near Palo Alto, with life-threatening injuries. Some of the victims were his coworkers. Several children were also present at that shooting scene, but they were left unharmed.

At approximately 4:40 p.m., the suspect, Chunli Zhao, who was a resident and worker at the first farm, was found in his vehicle in the parking lot of the San Mateo County Sheriff's Office substation at 557 Kelly Avenue in downtown Half Moon Bay. He was taken into custody without incident, and a weapon was located inside his vehicle.

Victims
The victims were identified as Yetao Bing, 43; Qizhong Cheng, 66; Zhishen Liu, 73; Jingzhi Lu, 64; Marciano Martinez Jimenez, 50; Jose Romero Perez, 38; and Aixiang Zhang, 74. Five of them were Chinese citizens according to China's consulate in San Francisco, which strongly condemned the violence.

Accused 

The district attorney said the accused, 66-year-old Chunli Zhao, was from China and had lived in the United States for at least a decade. He stayed with 34 other employees in 2022 when Mountain Mushroom Farm's ownership was changed to California Terra Garden. Zhao is or was a coworker of the victims at each site, and officials have described the shootings as "workplace violence". He has been charged with seven counts of murder, one count of attempted murder, firearm use enhancements, and a count of special circumstance allegation of multiple murder. Zhao later expressed his grievances to investigators and during a jailhouse interview. They ranged from being bullied, working long hours and his supervisor, who would be killed during the attack, demanding that Zhao pay $100 for a forklift repair after a collision Zhao blamed on a coworker. Zhao expressed regret for carrying out the shootings. He could face the death penalty if convicted.

Reactions 

In a press briefing, White House Press Secretary Karine Jean-Pierre expressed that President Joe Biden had directed federal law enforcement to help local authorities during their investigations. Governor of California Gavin Newsom was informed of the shooting while visiting the hospitalized victims of the Monterey Park shooting of less than 48 hours earlier, describing the two events in conjunction as "tragedy upon tragedy."

The living conditions of the workers at California Terra Garden drew attention following reports that many of them lived in shipping or storage containers and the site did not follow all permit and code requirements. Some were also paid below the minimum legal wage in California. The company later stated that it would improve the housing for workers and their families.

According to the Gun Violence Archive, which defines mass shootings as ones with four or more casualties (excluding the shooter), the Half Moon Bay shootings as a whole represent the 37th mass shooting in the United States in 2023. According to Mother Jones, which excludes mass shootings in the context of robbery, gang violence or domestic abuse, it is the second mass shooting in 2023.

See also
 List of mass shootings in the United States in 2023
 List of shootings in California

References

2023 active shooter incidents in the United States
2023 crimes in California
2023 mass shootings in the United States
Attacks in the United States in 2023
Chinese people murdered abroad
Deaths by firearm in California
Half Moon Bay, California
January 2023 crimes in the United States
Mass shootings in California
Mass shootings in the United States
Massacres in 2023
Massacres in the United States
Spree shootings in the United States
Workplace shootings in the United States